Established in 2002, the Echo Park Film Center is a Los Angeles-based nonprofit media arts organization located in the Echo Park neighborhood of Los Angeles. The Echo Park Film Center provides equal and affordable access to film/video education and resources via a community microcinema and meeting space, free and low-cost filmmaking classes and workshops, comprehensive small format film equipment rental and resources, and a green-energy mobile cinema/film school.

Microcinema 
The Echo Park Film Center's 65-seat microcinema screens an international array of documentary and experimental films every Thursday at 8 pm. EPFC also hosts film festivals touring artists, community events, guest lectures and a summer Artist-In-Residence program. The microcinema is available for private screenings and special events at affordable rates.

Retail and resources 
The retail department offers film and video equipment and services. EPFC carries Super 8, 8mm, 16mm, and digital video equipment and supplies for sale and rental. Services include film to digital transfers, hourly-rate editing facilities, and a lending library.

Community classes 
The Echo Park Film Center offers free film and video classes for neighborhood youth and seniors as well as low-cost workshops for adults.

Filmmobile 
A project of the Echo Park Film Center since 2007, the Filmmobile takes EPFC programs on the road to better serve Los Angeles and facilitate media arts exchanges with communities beyond Los Angeles. Running on waste-vegetable oil and green technologies, the Filmmobile is a model of sustainability that celebrates the long tradition of itinerant cinema.

Outdoor screenings
The Filmmobile Summer Screening Series invites Angelenos to discover and explore their changing urban landscape through an array of classic films at cinematic locations across the city. The Filmmobile partners with local organizations and filmmakers to screen films at community gatherings and special events. National and international tours present special programs of experimental and documentary films by established and emerging filmmakers.

Workshops
The Filmmobile brings free filmmaking workshops to media-marginalized populations, specifically at-risk youth, girls and young women, recent immigrants, the homeless, seniors, people of color and low-income earners. These programs provide a fertile meeting space for skills building and the exchange and validation of ideas, knowledge, and experiences, empowering individuals to share their unique stories with the world.

Radio 
Echo Park Film Center operates KFEP-LP a low-power FM station at 99.1.

References

External links
 Official Website
 Filmmobile website
 

Arts organizations based in California
Experimental film
Cinemas and movie theaters in Los Angeles
Education in Los Angeles
Non-profit organizations based in Los Angeles
Echo Park, Los Angeles
Arts organizations established in 2002
2002 establishments in California